Jo Koy: Live from Seattle is a 2017 Netflix stand-up comedy special by American comic Jo Koy, his first Netflix stand-up special for Netflix. In Live from Seattle, directed by Shannon Hartman, Jo Koy talks about Filipina stereotypes, raising a teenage boy and more.

Cast
 Jo Koy

Release
It was released on March 28, 2017 on Netflix streaming.

References

External links
 
 
 

2017 television specials
Netflix specials
Stand-up comedy concert films
Koy, Jo: Live from Seattle